Mario Montano may refer to:

 Mario Aldo Montano (born 1948), Italian Olympic fencer
 Mario Tullio Montano (1944–2017), Italian Olympic fencer